Fuzzy Warbles Volume 1 is the first volume in the Fuzzy Warbles series, released in December 2002. The Fuzzy Warbles Series brings together demos, rarities and side projects from XTC founding member Andy Partridge.

Track listing
All songs written by Andy Partridge.

 "Dame Fortune" – 2:40
 "Born out of Your Mouth" – 2:48
 "Howlin' Burston" – 0:36
 "Don't Let Us Bug Ya" – 2:43
 "That Wag" – 4:52
 "That Wave" – 3:43
 "Ocean's Daughter" – 1:13
 "Everything" – 3:17
 "MOGO" – 2:16
 "Goosey Goosey" – 3:54
 "Merely a Man" – 2:49
 "EPNS" – 2:40
 "Summer Hot As This" – 4:15
 "Miniature Sun" – 4:22
 "I Bought Myself a Liarbird" – 3:03
 "Complicated Game" – 2:42
 "Wonder Annual" – 4:03
 "Space Wray" – 1:46
 "Rocket" – 5:21

Personnel
Andy Partridge – instruments and vocals on all tracks
Dave Gregory – guitar on 5, 13, bass on 13, recording engineer on 12, 13
Colin Moulding – bass on 5
Dave Mattacks – drums on 5
Barry Hammond – recording engineer on 5
David Lord and Glenn Tommey – recording engineers on 7

Credits
All songs were recorded at Andy's home except 5 at Chipping Norton Recording Studios, Oxfordshire, 7 at Crescent Studios, Bath and 12, 13 at Dave's home.
Mastered by Ian Cooper at Metropolis Mastering, London
Sleeve art by Andrew Swainson
Thank you thank you Steve Young for handling it all. Mark Thomas for the beautiful Ape logo and Erica for the biggest love.
Big thanks to Virgin Records for making this series possible and to Dave Gregory for cleaning and supplying master tapes for 5, 12 and 13.

Andy Partridge albums
Demo albums
2002 compilation albums